Andorra competed at the 1980 Summer Olympics in Moscow, USSR.  In partial support of the American-led boycott of the 1980 Summer Olympics, Andorra competed under the Olympic Flag instead of its national flag.

Shooting

References
Official Olympic Reports
sports-reference

Nations at the 1980 Summer Olympics
1980
1980 in Andorra